Capixaba may refer to:

Places

 Capixaba, Acre, a municipality in the state of Acre, Brazil
 Capixaba, the demonym for the state of Espírito Santo, Brazil

Organizations

 Campeonato Capixaba, the football league of the state of Espírito Santo, Brazil

Species

 Blabicentrus capixaba, a species of beetle
 Cerithiopsis capixaba, a species of sea snail
 Chiasmocleis capixaba, a species of frog
 Neoregelia capixaba, a bromeliad species in the genus Neoregelia

Food 
 Moqueca Capixaba, a Brazilian moqueca stew from the Espírito Santo region, cooked in the traditional black clay capixaba pot

People
João Victor da Vitória Fernandes, known as Capixaba, Brazilian footballer